Khartoum National Club is a football club based in Khartoum, Sudan. They play in the top level of Sudanese professional football, the Sudan Premier League. Their rivals are Ahli Al Khartoum. Al Khartoum is one of the elite Sudanese football teams that has been playing in the top tier of Sudanese football constantly since their promotion in 1996. They were previously known as Al Khartoum 3 which is the neighbourhood the team was founded in. Al Khartoum was the first team to ever represent the Khartoum 3 district as most teams were representing Omdurman. The team has been finishing up most of the seasons 4th which reflects how keen they are to be a strong member of the top football teams in Sudan. Mamoun Bashir Elnefidi is the chairman of AL Khartoum who is a wealthy businessman known for his Elnefiedi Group which is one of Sudan's top conglomerates,

Performance in CAF competitions
CAF Confederation Cup: 6 appearances
2010 – First Round
2011 – First Round of 16
2013 – Preliminary Round
2015 – Preliminary Round
2016 – Preliminary Round
2019-20 - First round 
CAF Cup: 1 appearance
2003 – First Round

Performance in UAFA competitions
UAFA Club Championship 1 appearance 
2012-13 –Second Round

Performance in CECAFA competitionsCECAFA Clubs Cup/Kagame Interclub Cup 2 appearances 
2003 – Quarter-finals
2015 – Semi-finals

Players

Managers 

  James Kwesi Appiah (2014–2017)

References

External links 
 Official Facebook page of Khartoum National Club

Football clubs in Sudan
Sport in Khartoum
1950 establishments in Sudan